Dou is the Mandarin pinyin romanization of the Chinese surname written  in simplified Chinese and  in traditional Chinese. It is romanized Tou in Wade–Giles. Dou is listed 39th in the Song dynasty classic text Hundred Family Surnames. As of 2008, it is the 219th most common surname in China, shared by 380,000 people.

Notable people
 Empress Dou (Wen) (died 135 BC), wife of Emperor Wen of Han and mother of Emperor Jing
 Dou Ying (窦婴; died 131 BC), Western Han general and chancellor
 Dou Rong (竇融; 16 BC – 62 AD), Eastern Han general and minister
 Dou Gu (died 88), Eastern Han general
 Dou Xian (died 92), Eastern Han general
 Empress Dou (Zhang) (died 97), wife of Emperor Zhang of Han, sister of Dou Xian
 Dou Wu (died 168), Eastern Han official, father of Empress Dou Miao
 Dou Miao (died 172), wife of Emperor Huan of Han
 Dou Chong (竇衝; died 394?), Former Qin general
 Empress Taimu (太穆皇后; 569–613), Tang dynasty empress, wife of Emperor Gaozu, and mother of Emperor Taizong
 Dou Wei (died 618), Tang dynasty chancellor
 Dou Jiande (573–621), Sui dynasty rebel leader
 Dou Kang (died 621), Tang dynasty chancellor
 Dou Dexuan (598–666), Tang dynasty chancellor
 Empress Zhaocheng (昭成皇后; died 693), mother of Emperor Xuanzong of Tang
 Dou Huaizhen (died 713), Tang dynasty chancellor
 Dou Can (734–793), Tang dynasty chancellor
 Dou Wentao (竇文濤; born 1967), Phoenix TV host
 Dou Wei (born 1969), singer-songwriter
 Shawn Dou or Dou Xiao (born 1988), Chinese-Canadian actor

References

Chinese-language surnames
Individual Chinese surnames